Chuda is a town and Taluka headquarter of Chuda Taluka in Surendranagar district, Gujarat, India. It was formerly a Rajput princely state.

History
During the British raj, it was a third class state under the colonial Eastern Kathiawar Agency.

It ceased to exist on 15 February 1948 by accession to newly independent India's Saurashtra State. The privy purse was fixed at 51,250 Rupees. The Rajput line of nominal Thakurs in continued.

Thakur Shris
 1707 - 1747                Abhasinhji Madhavsinhji  (died 1747) 
 1747 - 1768                Raisinhji Abhasinhji, son of the above  (d. 1768) 
 1768 - 1780                Gajsinhji Raisinhji, son of the above  (d. 1780)  
 1780 - 1820                Hathisinhji Gajsinhji, son of the above  (d. 1820) 
 1820 - 1830                Abhasinhji Hathisinhji, son of the above
 1830 - 1854                Raisinhji Abhasinhji, son of the above 
 24 July 1854 – 13 Jan 1908  Bacharsinhji Raisinhji, son of the above  (b. 1840 - d. 1908)
 22 Feb 1908 – 20 Jan 1921  Jorawarsinhji Bacharsinhji, son of the firstborn son of the above     (b. 1886 - d. 1921) 
 20 Jan 1921 - 1947         Bahadursinhji Jorawarsinhji, son of the above, ?last ruler  (b. 1909 - d. ... ) 
 20 Jan 1920 – 7 Feb 1929 ... -Regent
 Dharmendrasinhji Bahadursinhji, son of the above
 4 Oct 1950  Krishnakumarsinhji Dharmendrasinhji, son of Bahadursinhji

Demographics
The state had a population of 11,333 in 1921.

Economy and transport
There is a railway station at Chuda on the Bhavnagar-Wadhwan line. The soil of Chuda is very fertile, and the water is considered good.

References

External links
 Indian Princely States on www.uq.net.au, as archives on web.archive.org, with genealogy

 This article incorporates text from a publication now in the public domain: 

Princely states of Gujarat
Rajput princely states
Taluka of Surendranagar